Difuntos Correa (lit. "Deceased Correa") is a Chilean rock band. The band was formed in Santiago de Chile in 2003. On June 10, 2008, the band began its first international tour, to Spain, France and Sweden.

Members

Current members 
 Sergio "Checho" Gómez,  guitar and vocals (2003 - now)
 Dan Zamora, rhythm guitar (2013 - now)
 Joaquín Valdivieso, saxophone, flute and bongo (2003 - 2009, 2013 - now)
 Miguel Rodríguez, bass (2003 - 2010, 2013 - now)
 Carlos "Charly" Gómez, drums (2003 - now)

Past members 
 Andrés Olivos, vocals and rhythm guitar (2003 - 2012).
 Erasmo Menares, trumpet (2003 - 2012).
 César Fuentes (musician), trombone (2003 - 2012).
 Sergio Carlini, percussion (2011)

Discography
2004 Tramposo amor
2006 Resucitando la fe en un beso fatal
2009 Ilusionismo
2013 El Aprendiz

References

External links
 Difuntos Correa (Official Site)

Chilean rock music groups
Rock en Español music groups
Musical groups established in 2003